FX is a UK monthly trade magazine for the contract interior design industry, published by Progressive Media Publishing. It has an ABC audited circulation of 15,055.

History and profile
FX was founded in 1991. Janine Furness is the launch editor. It was published by ETP. The magazine organises and promotes the annual FX Awards for contract designers and design projects, which are recognised by the Design Council as the leading awards for the contract interior design industry. The magazine is published on a monthly basis.

References

External links 
 FX Magazine
 FX page on ABC website, subscriber-only

Visual arts magazines published in the United Kingdom
Monthly magazines published in the United Kingdom
Design magazines
Magazines published in London
Magazines established in 1991
Professional and trade magazines